John Young is an American politician. He serves as a Republican member for the 47th district of the Indiana House of Representatives.

Young was educated at Indiana Creek High School, Indiana University and Southern Illinois University.

In 2016 he was elected for the 47th district of the Indiana House of Representatives, assuming office on November 9, 2016. In May 2022, Young lost his renomination bid for the State House to Robb Greene.

References 

Living people
Place of birth missing (living people)
Year of birth missing (living people)
Republican Party members of the Indiana House of Representatives
21st-century American politicians
Indiana University alumni
Southern Illinois University alumni